FGV Brasília is a Brazilian private higher education institution established in 1978 and linked to the Fundação Getúlio Vargas. It is the only institution of FGV located outside the Rio de Janeiro-São Paulo axis. The FGV Center in Brasília develops strict graduate programs in various areas of knowledge. It also designs and develops in-company corporate education programs.

External links 
 Official website

Fundação Getulio Vargas
Educational institutions established in 1978
1978 establishments in Brazil